Homelessness in Papua New Guinea is a significant issue in Port Moresby, the nation's capital city.

Youth homelessness
It is estimated that the homeless population in the nation's capital includes over 5,000 homeless children. The government and charities working in the region state that migration from rural to urban areas are a leading cause for the rise in homelessness.

Working street children
One study on working street children in Papua New Guinea surveyed 324 children, of which seven percent were currently living on the street, but overall, 51% had been living on the street at one point in the past.

Following natural disasters
Other instances of homelessness include families who have lost their homes due to natural disasters. In 2017, around 500 people became homeless following floods in the Eastern Highlands Province.

In 2007, some 13,000 people became homeless following flooding in the Northern Province.

Government responses
National Office of Child and Family Service (NOCFS) is tasked with providing a response to homelessness.

Legislation
Lukautim Pikinini (Child) Act 2009

Active charities
Life Care PNG

References

Papua New Guinea
Society of Papua New Guinea
Social issues in Papua New Guinea